Turn and Burn: No-Fly Zone is a jet flight simulator from Absolute Entertainment for the Super NES, released in 1994. It is the sequel to Turn and Burn: The F-14 Dogfight Simulator, a Game Boy game which also featured the F-14 Tomcat aircraft. An enhanced port of this game was released as F-14 Tomcat on Game Boy Advance. A Sega Mega Drive version was planned but never released.

Gameplay

This game is played in first-person perspective, inside the cockpit. The player has on the beginning of every mission to launch from an aircraft carrier and has to land on it on the end of every mission as well.

While on air, the player will receive their objective, which consists of taking down enemy jets and/or enemy bases on small islands. The player has three types of missiles and a cannon to destroy the enemy jets. Each missile differs on range, accuracy and speed. To destroy the enemy bases, the player can only use the cannon.

On later missions with an increasing number of targets, the player's limited fuel and ammunition supplies becomes a factor. It is possible to refuel the jet while on air, attaching to a bigger aircraft sent by the aircraft carrier, but to reload the missiles players must land on the aircraft carrier.

By pressing and holding the "Y" button on the controller before the player takes off, he can access a fully configurable Tomcat's system menu. The player will also be able to change missiles, HUD options along with other changeable features of the aircraft.

See also
 Super Strike Eagle

References

External links
 Super Dogfight - F-14 Tomcat Air Combat Game at superfamicom.org
 Super Dogfight at super-famicom.jp 

1994 video games
Absolute Entertainment games
Cancelled Sega Genesis games
Combat flight simulators
Game Boy Advance games
Imagineering (company) games
Pack-In-Video games
Single-player video games
Super Nintendo Entertainment System games
Video games developed in the United States
Video games scored by Mark Van Hecke